Tremor Mountain is a prominent  summit located in the Garibaldi Ranges of the Coast Mountains, in Garibaldi Provincial Park of southwestern British Columbia, Canada. It is the highest point of the Spearhead Range, which is a subset of the Garibaldi Ranges. Precipitation runoff from the south side of the peak as well as meltwater from the Platform Glacier drains into Fitzsimmons Creek which is a tributary of the Cheakamus River. Meltwater from the Tremor Glacier on the northwestern slope drains to Wedge Creek, and meltwater from the Shudder Glacier on the northeast slope drains into Billygoat Creek, a tributary of the Lillooet River. Tremor Mountain is often climbed as part of the Spearhead Traverse. The first ascent of the mountain was made in 1928 by A.J. Campbell Garibaldi survey party. The mountain's name origin refers to unexplained earth tremors when the first ascent party was on the summit. The mountain's name was officially adopted on September 6, 1951, by the Geographical Names Board of Canada.

Climate
Based on the Köppen climate classification, Tremor Mountain is located in the marine west coast climate zone of western North America. Most weather fronts originate in the Pacific Ocean, and travel east toward the Coast Mountains where they are forced upward by the range (Orographic lift), causing them to drop their moisture in the form of rain or snowfall. As a result, the Coast Mountains experience high precipitation, especially during the winter months in the form of snowfall. Temperatures can drop below −20 °C with wind chill factors below −30 °C. The months July through September offer the most favorable weather for climbing Tremor Mountain.

Climbing Routes
Established climbing routes on Tremor Mountain:
   
 East Ridge 
 West Face
 North Face
 West Ridge

See also

 Geography of British Columbia
 Geology of British Columbia

Gallery

References

External links
 Weather forecast: Tremor Mountain

Garibaldi Ranges
Two-thousanders of British Columbia
Pacific Ranges
Sea-to-Sky Corridor
New Westminster Land District